Elsewhere is a 2009 American crime thriller drama film directed by Nathan Hope and starring Anna Kendrick, Paul Wesley and Tania Raymonde.

Plot

Cast
Anna Kendrick as Sarah
Jon Gries as Mr. Tod
Olivia Dawn York as Darla Tod
Paul Wesley as Billy
Tania Raymonde as Jillian
Jeff Daniel Phillips as Officer Berg
Chuck Carter as Jasper
Shannon Holt as Patty Melville

Production
Filming occurred in Goshen, Indiana in 2006.

References

External links
 
 

American crime thriller films
American crime drama films
American thriller drama films
Films shot in Indiana
2009 directorial debut films
2009 films
2000s English-language films
2000s American films